Dziękuję bardzo is the thirty-ninth album by Klaus Schulze. It was originally released in 2009, and, taking in consideration the previously released multi-disc box sets (Silver Edition, Historic Edition, Jubilee Edition, Contemporary Works I, and Contemporary Works II), it could be viewed as Schulze's one hundredth album. This is the third Schulze album with guest vocalist Lisa Gerrard. It was recorded at two concerts in Warsaw, Poland, and Berlin, Germany. This album was released as a set of three CDs, as well as a separate DVD. The album title means "Thank you very much" in Polish.

Track listing

External links 
 Dziękuję bardzo at the official site of Klaus Schulze
 

Klaus Schulze albums
Ambient albums by German artists
Trance albums
2009 live albums
Klaus Schulze live albums